St. Philip's Episcopal Church is an historic Episcopal church located in the High Hills of Santee, in the antebellum summer resort community of Bradford Springs in Lee County, South Carolina, about six miles north of Dalzell.

It is no longer an active parish in the Episcopal Diocese of South Carolina, but the historic parish church is maintained by local descendants of the original members with assistance from the diocese.

History
Built in 1840 in what was then part of Sumter County, it is an early example of the Carpenter Gothic style of architecture. It is unusual among such churches in featuring a pointed arch window in its front gable rather than the customary circular rose window. On April 17, 1996, it was added to the National Register of Historic Places.

Cemetery
St. Philip's Cemetery is included in the historic place designation. Buried there is the Rev. Charles Pinckney Elliott, the first rector of the church.

See also

List of Registered Historic Places in South Carolina
 St. Philip's Episcopal Church

References

External links
 National Register listings for Lee County
 South Carolina Department of Archives and History file on St. Philip's Church

Churches on the National Register of Historic Places in South Carolina
Former Episcopal church buildings in South Carolina
Carpenter Gothic church buildings in South Carolina
Cemeteries in South Carolina
High Hills of Santee
Churches in Lee County, South Carolina
19th-century Episcopal church buildings
National Register of Historic Places in Lee County, South Carolina